Phosphinothricin acetyltransferase (PAT, PPT acetyltransferase, Pt-N-acetyltransferase, ac-Pt) is an enzyme with systematic name acetyl-CoA:phosphinothricin N-acetyltransferase. This enzyme catalyses the following chemical reaction

 acetyl-CoA + phosphinothricin  CoA + N-acetylphosphinothricin

The substrate phosphinothricin is used as a nonselective herbicide and is a potent inhibitor of EC 6.3.1.2.

References

External links 
 

EC 2.3.1